"Everyday I Love You Less and Less" is the opening track on Leeds-based indie band Kaiser Chiefs' first album, Employment (2005). It was released on the B-Unique label as their third single (not counting re-issues) on 16 May 2005, peaking at number 10 on the UK Singles Chart, their second top-10 single of the year. Outside the UK, the song peaked at number 52 in the Netherlands. The music video was directed by Tim Pope.

Background
Singer Ricky Wilson described the song as a "hate ballad" and added, "Usually bands release for their third single a love ballad but we decided to do the opposite. It's for anyone who's ever split up with someone and they don't leave you alone. ... I was describing that song the other day, you think it's going to be quite bouncy but it's actually as negative as you can be!"

Dorian Lynskey of The Guardian wrote that the Kaiser Chiefs had been labeled as has-beens by 2003-2004, and they were desperate to build a fanbase to impress record labels: "The need to make an impression while bottom of the bill in a tiny venue explains all the ohhhhhhs and nanananas and oft-repeated choruses that set up shop in the listener's brain after the first listen."

Track listings

UK CD1
 "Everyday I Love You Less and Less" (Spike Stent remix)
 "Another Number" (the Cribs cover)

UK CD2 and Australasian CD single
 "Everyday I Love You Less and Less" (Spike Stent remix)
 "Seventeen Cups"
 "Not Surprised"
 "Everyday I Love You Less and Less" (video)

UK 7-inch picture disc
A. "Everyday I Love You Less and Less" (Spike Stent remix)
B. "The Letter Song"

European CD single
 "Everyday I Love You Less and Less" (Spike Stent remix)
 "Take My Temperature" (live at Pinkpop
 "Modern Way" (live at Pinkpop)

Charts

Weekly charts

Year-end charts

Certifications

References

2004 songs
2005 singles
Kaiser Chiefs songs
British new wave songs
Music videos directed by Tim Pope
Song recordings produced by Stephen Street
Songs written by Andrew White (musician)
Songs written by Nick "Peanut" Baines
Songs written by Nick Hodgson
Songs written by Ricky Wilson (British musician)
Songs written by Simon Rix